Peter Anthony Rosazza (born February 13, 1935) is an American prelate of the Roman Catholic Church. He served as an auxiliary bishop of the Archdiocese of Hartford from 1978 to 2010.

Biography

Early life
The eldest child of Aldo and Agatha (née Dinneen) Rosazza, Peter Rosazza was born on February 13, 1935, in New Haven, Connecticut, and raised in Torrington, Connecticut. He attended St. Francis Elementary School in Torrington and graduated from Torrington High School in 1952.

Rosazza studied at Dartmouth College in Hanover, New Hampshire, for a year before entering St. Thomas Seminary in Bloomfield, Connecticut. He then attended St. Bernard Seminary in Rochester, New York and Saint-Sulpice Seminary in Paris

Priesthood 
Rosazza was ordained to the priesthood by Bishop Jacques Le Cordier for the Archdiocese of Hartford in Rome on June 29, 1961. After returning to Connecticut, Rosazza served as assistant pastor at St. Timothy Parish in West Hartford, Connecticut. He later joined the faculty of St. Thomas Seminary, where he taught French, Spanish, and Italian. In 1972, Rosazza became co-pastor of Sacred Heart Parish, the mother church of Hartford's Hispanic Catholic community.

Auxiliary Bishop of Hartford 
Pope Paul VI appointed Rosazza as an auxiliary bishop of the Archdiocese of Hartford and titular bishop of Oppidum Novum on February 28, 1978. He was consecrated on June 24, 1978 by Archbishop John Whealon, with Bishops John Hackett and Ulises Vargas serving as co-consecrators.

As auxiliary bishop, Rosazza was assigned in 1981 to pastoral work in Waterbury, Connecticut.  Between 1980 and 1986, he served as a member of the Committee of Bishops that wrote the pastoral letter Economic Justice for All. In 1988, he was transferred to a parish in New Haven, Connecticut. On February 2, 1997, Rosazza was named episcopal vicar for Spanish-speaking Catholics in the archdiocese.

Rosazza was a member of the United States Conference of Catholic Bishops' (USCCB) Committee for Social Development and World Peace and was liaison with Brazilian Catholics for the Committee on Migration and Refugees. He also served as bishop advisor to the National Catholic Student Coalition. He is one of the founders of the Naugatuck Valley Project, a coalition of churches and labor union locals as well as ECCO (Elm City Congregations Organized), a community organization of 18 churches in the New Haven, Connecticut area.Rosazza was one of five American bishops who drafted the USCCB pastoral letter on the U.S. Economy and Catholic social teaching.

On January 19, 2004, Rosazza announced the resignation of Andrew Brizzolara, the pastor of St. Michael's Parish in New Haven.  Brizzolara had been accused of sexual abuse in the 1980's during his time serving in the Archdiocese of Boston.In December 2009, Rosazza sat for a one-hour public radio interview on the Colin McEnroe show.

On June 30, 2010, Pope Benedict XVI accepted Rosazza's letter of resignation as auxiliary bishop of the Diocese of Hartford, submitted when Rosazza turned age 75 on February 13, 2010.

See also
 

 Catholic Church hierarchy
 Catholic Church in the United States
 Historical list of the Catholic bishops of the United States
 List of Catholic bishops of the United States
 Lists of patriarchs, archbishops, and bishops

References

External links
Roman Catholic Archdiocese of Hartford Official Site

Episcopal succession

1935 births
Living people
Religious leaders from New Haven, Connecticut
20th-century Roman Catholic bishops in the United States
Dartmouth College alumni
Seminary of Saint-Sulpice (France) alumni
Catholics from Connecticut
21st-century Roman Catholic bishops in the United States